The Erdal Öz Prize is a Turkish literary award presented annually.  It was established in 2008 by Can Publisher, in memory of author and founder of Can Publisher, Erdal Öz.

The winner receives 15,000 Turkish liras, approximately US $5,000.

Award winners
2021 Selim İleri
2020 Jale Parla
2019 Latife Tekin
2018 Adalet Ağaoğlu
2017 
2016 
2015 Orhan Pamuk
2014 Küçük İskender
2013 
2012 Murathan Mungan
2011 
2010 
2009 İhsan Oktay Anar
2008 Gülten Akın

See also
 
 Turkish literature
 List of literary awards
 List of years in literature
 Literary award

References

External links
Official website

Turkish literary awards
Awards established in 2008